Pay as you go or PAYG may refer to:

Finance
 Pay-as-you-go tax, or pay-as-you-earn tax
 Pay-as-you-go pension plan
 PAYGO, the practice in the US of financing expenditures with current funds rather than borrowing
 PAUG, a structured financial product
 Prepayment (disambiguation), especially incremental prepayment; in particular
 Prepaid mobile phone

Music
 Pay As U Go, a UK garage crew

See also
 PAYE (disambiguation)